St. Stephens High School is a high school located in Hickory, North Carolina, United States. It is in Catawba County, and is part of the Catawba County School district.

History 
St. Stephens was formed when Allen Frye, Peace Academy, Lail, Sandy Ridge, and Cloninger combined into one school. The school first opened in the fall of 1934, with R. N. Hoyle serving as the first teacher and principal. The first school building was used by elementary through high school students until 1953, when a new building was provided specifically for St. Stephens High School.

General info 
The school colors are red, black, gray, and white. Saint's team name are the Indians. As of 2021, the principal is Kyle Stocks. St. Stephens enrolls approximately 1,250 students each year. Harry M. Arndt Middle School is the feeder school of St. Stephens.

Athletics 
The school is a member of the North Carolina High School Athletic Association (NCHSAA) and is currently classified as a 3A school. Sports at St. Stephens include cross country, cheerleading, football, soccer, golf, tennis, volleyball, basketball, indoor/outdoor track, wrestling, swimming, lacrosse and baseball.

The St. Stephens baseball team won three straight North Carolina 2A State Championships from 1971–1973. 

In 2019, the St. Stephens wrestling team completed an undefeated 43–0 season, winning the 3A State Dual Team Championship.

Notable alumni 
 Mark K. Hilton, member of the North Carolina General Assembly representing the state's 96th district
 Andy Houston, former NASCAR driver in the Craftsman Truck Series, Busch Series, and Winston Cup Series
 Shane Huffman, former NASCAR driver and current crew chief
 Sydney Shepherd, actor, musician, starred on Broadway in First Date
 Drew Starkey, actor, best known for his role as Rafe Cameron in the Netflix series Outer Banks

References

External links 
 St. Stephens High School website
 History of St. Stephens High School
 St. Stephens High School wrestling team page
 St. Stephens High School's Tractor Shed Theatre 

Educational institutions established in 1934
Public high schools in North Carolina
Hickory, North Carolina
Schools in Catawba County, North Carolina
1934 establishments in North Carolina